Macharia  is an African name from the Kikuyu people, the largest ethnic group in Kenya. It is given to baby boys. The name means "the one who looks" or "the one who searches"

Emily Waita Macharia (born 1979), Kenyan public relations officer
Faith Macharia (born 1976), Kenyan middle-distance runner and 2004 Olympian
James Mwangi Macharia (born 1984), Kenyan road running athlete
James Mwangi  (born 1962) Chief Executive Officer of Equity Bank Kenya Limited
James Wainaina Macharia, a Kenyan accountant
Laila Macharia, Founder of Scion Real, a diversified investment firm
Macharia Kamau, Kenyan diplomat and UN representative
Samuel Kamau Macharia, Kenyan founder and chair of Royal Media Services, the largest private radio and television network in Eastern Africa.

Bantu-language surnames